René Lange (born 22 November 1988) is a German professional footballer who plays as a defender or midfielder for FC Carl Zeiss Jena.

Career
Lange was born in Teterow, East Germany.

Hansa Rostock
In July 2009, Lange signed a professional contract with the club. He made his competitive debut for the senior team on 27 September 2009 in a 4–0 home victory over Greuther Fürth. He was subbed on for Fin Bartels in the 80th minute.

1. FC Magdeburg
In July 2013, Lange moved to then Regionalliga club 1. FC Magdeburg on a two-year deal. He made his competitive debut for the club on 3 August 2013 in a 1–0 home defeat to Energie Cottbus in the DFB-Pokal. Just eight days later, he made his first league appearance for the club in a 3–1 away defeat to Berliner AK 07. He scored his first competitive goal for the club on 23 March 2014 in a 6–0 home victory over Optik Rathenow. His goal, scored in the 65th minute, made the score 5–0 to Magdeburg.

FSV Zwickau
In July 2015, Lange joined FSV Zwickau on a free transfer. He made his competitive debut for the club on 24 July 2015 in a 3–0 away victory over Berliner FC Dynamo. He scored his first competitive goal for the club on 20 September 2015 in a 3–2 home victory over TSG Neustrelitz. His goal, scored in the 48th minute, made the score 1–0 to Zwickau. During Zwickau's match against Energie Cottbus on 6 October 2018, Lange tore a muscle in his adductor region, ruling him out for six weeks. On 12 October 2018, Lange signed a two-year contract extension with the club.

References

External links
 
 

1988 births
Living people
People from Teterow
People from Bezirk Neubrandenburg
German footballers
Footballers from Mecklenburg-Western Pomerania
Association football defenders
Association football midfielders
2. Bundesliga players
3. Liga players
FC Hansa Rostock players
1. FC Magdeburg players
FSV Zwickau players
FC Carl Zeiss Jena players
1. FC Neubrandenburg 04 players